The Lu Xun Literary Institute, located in Beijing, is China's only national academy in literature education. Established in 1950 as the Central Literary Research Institute, it was closed in 1957 due to the Anti-Rightist Movement and not reopened until 1980. The current name, after the prominent literary figure Lu Xun, was adapted in 1984. Ding Ling was the institute's first director.

Book

References

Educational institutions established in 1950
1950 establishments in China
Universities and colleges in Beijing
Lu Xun